Bertin Nahum (born 14 November 1969 in Dakar (Senegal)) is a French-Beninese entrepreneur in surgical robotics. He is the CEO and co-founder of Quantum Surgical based in Montpellier, France. He previously founded in 2002 Medtech S.A; specializing in the design, development and marketing of surgical assistance robots that was sold to Zimmer Biomet in 2016.

Biography 

Bertin Nahum attended the National Institute of Applied Sciences in Lyon (France) where he achieved an Engineering Degree. He then went on to study a Masters in Robotics at Coventry University(UK).
Following different experiences in the medical engineering field and having collaborated with well-known surgeons, Bertin Nahum decided to devote his career to creating medical technology solutions to enhance surgical interventions, including creating the latest generation of robotic assistance to use during operations.
In 2002, after winning the national innovative start-up companies contest organized by the French Ministry of Higher education and Research, Bertin Nahum founded Medtech S.A.

Medtech S.A.

Set up in Montpellier in 2002, the company began to work on minimally-invasive knee surgery and developed its very first robot which they named BRIGIT™. BRIGIT™ was designed to assist surgeons in minimally-invasive placement of knee prostheses. In 2006, the entire patent portfolio protecting BRIGIT™ was acquired by Zimmer Inc., a leader in orthopedic surgery. 
Medtech S.A reinvested the proceeds of this deal in a new research program which led to the creation of its next robot; ROSA™. This technology has been used successfully on patients with a variety of diseases including Parkinson's, hydrocephalus and drug-resistant forms of epilepsy. Using robotic arms, ROSA™ makes interventions more efficient and less invasive. To this day, thousands of patients across Europe, North America, Asia and the Middle East benefited from brain and spine interventions carried out with ROSA™.
In 2013, the company launched a successful initial public offering (IPO), raising EUR 20M on Euronext in Paris.
In July 2016, Medtech S.A was acquired by the Zimmer Biomet Group (NYSE: ZBH) for EUR 164M. Bertin Nahum maintained his leadership role and directed Zimmer's robotic development activities at Medtech S.A company's current headquarters in Montpellier until January 2017.

Quantum Surgical

In February 2017, Bertin Nahum, together with three of his former associates founded Quantum Surgical. Based in Montpellier, the company continues to explore the potential of minimally-invasive surgical robotics, now focusing on cancer treatment, particularly liver cancer.  
In June 2018, Quantum Surgical raised $10M in a Series A funding round led by Ally Bridge Group. In April 2019, Quantum Surgical, Ally Bridge and LifeTech Scientific announce three-way China joint venture to develop innovative surgical robot for the treatment of liver cancer.
 
With 8,000 new cases every year in France, and 800, 000 around the world, liver cancer is the 6th most common cancer in the world.

Distinctions 

In September 2012 Bertin Nahum was ranked 4th amongst the top 10 most revolutionary High-Tech Entrepreneurs by the Canadian magazine Discovery Series just behind Steve Jobs, Mark Zuckerberg and James Cameron. 
One year later, in September 2013, Bertin Nahum was conferred one of the highest French civilian distinction; the prestigious award of Knight of the Legion of Honor which he received from Fleur Pellerin then Minister of innovation and the Digital Economy.
In November 2014, Bertin Nahum received the title of Doctor of Technology, honoris causa, from Coventry University (UK) in recognition of his revolutionary contribution to the medical profession by improving surgical procedures using robotic medical technology.

References

1969 births
Living people
French company founders